The Dominion Elections Act was a bill passed by the House of Commons of Canada in 1920, under Robert Borden's Unionist government. The Act allowed white women to run for the Parliament of Canada. However, women from most/all minorities, for example, Aboriginals and Asians, were not granted these rights. This bill was passed due in part to the advocacy of Nellie McClung, a women's rights activist from Manitoba.

The law established the agency now known as Elections Canada with the position of Chief Electoral Officer as head of the agency.

Background

During World War I, the country was split on the issue of conscription. Ahead of the 1917 election, the Liberal Party experienced splits among individual MPs. Protests erupted over the government's plan to introduce conscription in what became known as the conscription crisis of 1917. Pro-conscription Liberals joined forces with the Conservative Party to form the Unionist Party in 1917, led by Prime Minister Robert Borden.

In an effort to increase votes for the new Unionist Party, Borden granted the vote to female relatives of active-duty soldiers. The 1917 election had the highest female voter turnout out of any other election, and the Unionist Party won a safe majority, with only Quebec voting majority Liberal.

See also
 Women's Franchise Act

References

Citations

Sources

1920 in Canadian law
1920 in women's history
Canadian federal legislation
Election legislation
Women's suffrage in Canada